2013–14 FIS Cross-Country World Cup was a multi-race tournament over the season for cross-country skiers. This was the 33rd official World Cup season in cross-country skiing for men and women. The season began on 29 November 2013 in Ruka, Finland, and ended on 16 March 2014 in Falun, Sweden.

This season's biggest event was the 2014 Winter Olympics.

Calendar

Men

Women

Men's team

Women's team

Men's standings

Overall

Women's standings

Overall

Nations Cup

Points distribution

The table shows the number of points won in the 2013–14 Cross-Country Skiing World Cup for men and women.

All results in all distance races and sprint races counts towards the overall World Cup totals.

All distance races, included individual stages in Tour de Ski and in World Cup Final (which counts as 50% of a normal race), count towards the distance standings. All sprint races, including the sprint races during the Tour de Ski and the first race of the World Cup final (which counts as 50% of a normal race), count towards the sprint standings.

In mass start races bonus points are awarded to the first 10 at each bonus station.

The Nations Cup ranking is calculated by adding each country's individual competitors' scores and scores from team events. Relay events count double, with only one team counting towards the total, while in team sprint events two teams contribute towards the total, with the usual World Cup points (100 to winning team, etc.) awarded.

Achievements
Only individual events.

First World Cup career victory

Men
, 24, in his 6th season – the WC 3 (15 km F Handicap Start) in Ruka; also first podium
, 23, in his 5th season – the WC 4 (15 km C) in Lillehammer; first podium was 2008–09 WC 27 (Sprint C) in Lahti 
, 28, in his 8th season – the WC 7 (Sprint C) in Asiago; first podium was 2009–10 WC 2 (Sprint C) in Ruka
, 24, in his 6th season – the WC 9 (Sprint F) in Oberhof; also first podium
, 26, in his 5th season – the WC 10 (Sprint F) in Lenzerheide; also first podium
, 30, in his 11th season – the WC 14 (9 km F Final Climb) in Val di Fiemme; first podium was 2013-14 WC 2 (30 km F) in Davos
, 21, in his 2nd season – the WC 15 (Sprint F) in Nové Město; first podium was 2013–14 WC 4 (Sprint F) in Davos

Women
, 23, in her 6th season – the WC 9 (Sprint F) in Oberhof; first podium was 2010–11 WC 20 (Sprint C) in Otepää 
, 23, in her 6th season – the WC 10 (Sprint F) in Lenzerheide; first podium was 2012–13 WC 11 (Sprint F) in Val Müstair 
, 25, in her 7th season – the WC 11 (10 km Mass Start) in Lenzerheide; first podium was 2012–13 WC 26 (Sprint C) in Stockholm

First World Cup podium

Men
, 27, in his 4th season – no. 3 in the WC 1 (10 km C) in Ruka
, 22, in his 3rd season – no. 3 in the WC 2 (15 km C) in Lillehammer
, 30, in his 10th season – no. 2 in the WC 3 (30 km F) in Davos
, 26, in his 9th season – no. 2 in the WC 4 (Sprint F) in Davos
, 21, in his 2nd season – no. 3 in the WC 4 (Sprint F) in Davos
, 23, in his 4th season – no. 3 in the WC 5 (Sprint C) in Asiago
, 23, in his 4th season – no. 3 in the WC 8 (Sprint F) in Szklarska Poręba
, 23, in his 9th season – no. 2 in the WC 11 (15 km C Mass Start) in Lenzerheide
, 28, in his 7th season – no. 3 in the WC 11 (15 km C Mass Start) in Lenzerheide
, 23, in his 4th season – no. 2 in the WC 9 (15 km C Mass Start) in Szklarska Poręba
, 22, in his 2nd season – no. 3 in the WC 14 (Sprint C) in Drammen

Women
, 24, in her 5th season – no. 3 in the WC 4 (Sprint F) in Davos
, 27, in her 10th season – no. 3 in the WC 8 (3 km F Prologue) in Oberhof
, 23, in her 2nd season – no. 3 in the WC 12 (Sprint F) in Lahti
, 20, in her 3rd season – no. 3 in the WC 14 (Sprint C) in Drammen
, 25, in her 7th season – no. 3 in the WC 15 (30 km C Mass Start) in Oslo

Victories in this World Cup (all-time number of victories as of 2013/14 season in parentheses)

Men
 , 6 (8) first places
 , 3 (4) first place
 , 2 (13) first places
 , 2 (2) first places
 , 1 (34) first places
 , 1 (18) first places
 , 1 (7) first places
 , 1 (6) first places
 , 1 (5) first places
 , 1 (4) first places
 , 1 (4) first places
 , 1 (3) first places
 , 1 (5) first places
 , 1 (3) first places
 , 1 (1) first places
 , 1 (1) first places
 , 1 (1) first places
 , 1 (1) first place
 , 1 (1) first place
 , 1 (1) first place

Women
 , 9 (87) first places
 , 6 (19) first places
 , 5 (49) first places
 , 3 (13) first places
 , 1 (8) first places
 , 1 (4) first places
 , 1 (3) first places
 , 1 (1) first places
 , 1 (1) first places
 , 1 (1) first places

Retirements
Following are notable cross-country skiers who announced their retirement after the 2013–14 season:

Men

Women

References 

 
FIS Cross-Country World Cup seasons
2014 in cross-country skiing
2013 in cross-country skiing